Samiuela Moli is a New Zealand born Tongan rugby union player who plays for the Tasman Mako in the Bunnings NPC and Moana Pasifika in Super Rugby. His position of choice is Hooker.

Tasman 
In September 2020 Moli was named in the Tasman Mako squad for the 2020 Mitre 10 Cup. The Mako went on to win their second premiership title in a row, with Moli coming off the bench in a 12-13 victory against  in the final.

Tonga 
Moli was named in the Tonga national rugby union team squad to play New Zealand and Samoa in July 2021. He made his debut against the All Blacks in a 102–0 loss for Tonga.

Moana Pasifika 
Moli signed with Moana Pasifika for the 2022 Super Rugby Pacific season.

References

External links
itsrugby.co.uk profile

1998 births
Living people
Moana Pasifika players
New Zealand rugby union players
Rugby union players from Gisborne, New Zealand
Tasman rugby union players
Tonga international rugby union players
Rugby union hookers